Brian Michael Stann (born September 24, 1980) is an American former mixed martial artist and U.S. Marine who competed as a Middleweight in the Ultimate Fighting Championship (UFC). He is a former WEC Light Heavyweight Champion. He was also a color commentator for both the Ultimate Fighting Championship and ACC football games on Fox Sports Net.

Background

Stann was born at Yokota Air Base in Fussa, Tokyo, Japan, and grew up in Scranton, Pennsylvania. He graduated from Scranton Preparatory School and subsequently enrolled in the United States Naval Academy in 1999 (Class of 2003). While at the Naval Academy, he played football for the Midshipmen as a middle linebacker.  Upon graduation, he was assigned as an infantry officer in the United States Marine Corps, eventually achieving the rank of captain.

On May 8, 2005, then-lieutenant Stann was assigned to the 3rd Battalion, 2nd Marines, commanding the 2nd Mobile Assault Platoon. During the Operation Matador (which took place during the Battle of Al-Qa'im), his unit was ambushed by insurgents while trying to secure the Ramana Bridge, near Karabilah. Stann and his unit held out for six days, under heavy attack, while coordinating air and tank support that eventually allowed them to be relieved on May 14, 2005. All 42 Marines in Stann's platoon survived. The following March, Stann was awarded the Silver Star, the nation's third-highest award for valor in combat. Part of the citation reads: "Second Lieutenant Stann personally directed two casualty operations, three vehicle recovery operations and multiple close air support missions under enemy small arms, machine gun and mortar fire in his 360-degree fight." This mission was shown on the episode, "Iraq's Most Wanted" on the History Channel show, Shootout!, in which Stann was interviewed. His actions were noted by President George W. Bush during one of his speeches. He left active duty in the Marine Corps as of May 2008. Stann was also the commanding officer in the 8th Marine Regiment Headquarters Company while continuing to fight in the WEC.

U.S. Marine Corps officials have stated that they continue to use Stann's story as a recruiting tool. He attributes his success in mixed martial arts to the foundation he learned while training at the Marine Corps Martial Arts Center for Excellence in Quantico, Virginia and the explosiveness and powerlifting exercises he learned while playing football. "He has been an ideal spokesperson and role model" for the Marine Corps, said Lt. Col. Mike Zeliff, assistant chief of staff for advertising with Marine Corps Recruiting Command.

Mixed martial arts career
Stann began his fighting career in 2006 while still serving on active duty, using accumulated leave to take time off for training and fights.

World Extreme Cagefighting

On March 26, 2008, Stann defeated Doug Marshall via KO to become the WEC Light Heavyweight champion. With this victory, Stann's MMA record reached 6–0, with five victories in the WEC.

In August 2008, Stann lost his title in his first defense, in a rematch against Steve Cantwell (a loss he avenged a year later).

Ultimate Fighting Championship

In 2008, Zuffa announced plans to merge the WEC's 185-lb and 205-lb weight classes with their UFC counterparts, allowing the WEC to concentrate on lighter weight classes (which eventually merged with the UFC as well).

Stann was scheduled to make his UFC debut on December 10, 2008, at the UFC: Fight For The Troops show, to be held at the Army base of Fort Bragg, North Carolina, but he was forced to withdraw from the card due to a foot injury sustained in training. Instead, he faced Krzysztof Soszynski at UFC 97 in Montreal, Quebec, Canada, on April 18, 2009. In the first round, Soszynski locked Stann in a kimura, forcing him to tap out for the first time in his career. Stann later stated in an issue of UFC Magazine that, because of previous military commitments, he was unable to adequately prepare himself for the "grappling-based" aspects of the fight, which contributed to his loss.

On September 16, 2009, at UFC Fight Night: Diaz vs. Guillard, Stann once again faced Steve Cantwell in a rubber match. Stann would go on to defeat Cantwell via unanimous decision (30–27, 30–27, 29–28). This would also be the first time he would fight to a decision in his professional career.

Stann defeated UFC newcomer Rodney Wallace on December 5, 2009, at The Ultimate Fighter 10 Finale by unanimous decision.

Stann then faced UFC newcomer Phil Davis on February 6, 2010, at UFC 109, losing via unanimous decision. Following the fight, Stann revealed he would drop to the 185 lbs. Middleweight division.

Stann then made his middleweight debut against Mike Massenzio on August 1, 2010, at UFC on Versus 2. Stann claimed his first ever submission victory, catching Massenzio in a triangle choke midway through the final round, in a bout that earned Fight of the Night honors.

Stann then fought in the co-main event of UFC 125 on New Years Day. He defeated Chris Leben with a first-round TKO stoppage. With this win, he became the second man to defeat Leben by way of strikes, the first being former UFC Middleweight Champion Anderson Silva.

Stann was scheduled to face former Pride Middleweight Champion Wanderlei Silva on May 28, 2011, at UFC 130.  However, Silva voiced his reluctance to face Stann and was replaced by former Sengoku Middleweight Champion Jorge Santiago. Stann defeated Santiago via TKO in the 2nd round. A right to the temple sent Santiago to the mat, followed by numerous strikes by Stann which forced the stoppage.

Stann then fought Chael Sonnen on October 8, 2011, at UFC 136 where he was defeated via second round submission.

Stann faced Alessio Sakara on April 14, 2012, at UFC on Fuel TV: Gustafsson vs. Silva. After knocking down Sakara early with knees from the clinch, Stann utilized heavy ground-and-pound, delivering short elbows and hammerfists that eventually knocked Sakara out. Stann was awarded the victory at 2:26 of the first round. After Stann delivered the knockout blow, he sat up and motioned to the ref that Sakara was out, rather than delivering unnecessary (and potentially damaging) blows before the ref could jump in and stop the fight. Stann's actions were highly praised by both the media and fighters, with UFC Light Heavyweight Champion Jon Jones being quoted as saying that Brian Stann's actions were "good for the sport." UFC president Dana White also issued his praise for Stann's actions in the cage, calling him "one of the classiest people on Earth!".

Stann was expected to face Héctor Lombard on August 4, 2012, at UFC on Fox 4.  However, Stann was forced out of the bout, citing a shoulder injury.

Stann next faced Michael Bisping on September 22, 2012, at UFC 152, losing by unanimous decision.

On March 3, 2013, at UFC on Fuel TV 8, the long-awaited fight between Stann and Wanderlei Silva happened, in a Light-Heavyweight division showdown. Stann lost the fight via KO in the second round, in a bout that featured back-and-forth action, earning both participants Fight of the Night honors.

On a special edition of Ariel Helwani's MMA Hour on July 11, 2013, Stann announced his retirement from mixed martial arts competition. Upon retiring, Stann became an analyst and commentator for Fox Sports and UFC. In August 2017, Stann announced that he would be leaving his job with Fox and UFC to become a real estate executive.

Professional Fighters League 
In May 2018, ESPN reported that Stann accepted the advisory role as the head of Fighter and Competition/Rules Committee in the advisory board of Professional Fighters League (PFL), formally known as World Series of Fighting, where PFL would launch its inaugural season on July 7, 2018, airing on NBC Sports. Stann's main responsibility in the role would be influencing PFL on tournaments management, treatment and recruitment of the fighters.  As per the report, Stann did not anticipate this new opportunity with PFL prior to leaving his commentary position with Fox Sports and the UFC.

Personal life
Stann is married. He and his wife Michelle along with their five daughters currently reside in Milton, Georgia. For nine years, Stann was president and CEO of Hire Heroes USA, a nonprofit organization that helps U.S. military veterans. Until August 2021 he was the Chief Operating Officer at FirstKey Homes (a Cerberus Capital Management portfolio company) and is currently CEO of Hunt Military Communities.

In the fall of 2010, Stann published his memoir "Heart for the Fight: A Marine Hero's Journey from the Battlefields of Iraq to Mixed Martial Arts Champion" (Zenith Press). Written with military historian John R. Bruning, "Heart for the Fight" details Stann's experiences as a youth growing up in Scranton, PA, playing football for the U.S. Naval Academy, serving as a decorated Marine in Iraq, and becoming WEC Light Heavyweight Champion.

Championships and accomplishments

Mixed martial arts
World Extreme Cagefighting
WEC Light Heavyweight Championship (One time)
Ultimate Fighting Championship
Fight of the Night (Three times)  vs. Mike Massenzio, Jorge Santiago and Wanderlei Silva
MMAFighting.com
2013 Best Fight of the Half-Year vs. Wanderlei Silva
CombatPress.com
2015 Broadcast Analyst of the Year

United States military
Awards and decorations of the United States military
Silver Star

Mixed martial arts record

|-
| Loss
| align=center| 12–6
| Wanderlei Silva
| KO (punches)
| UFC on Fuel TV: Silva vs. Stann
| 
| align=center| 2
| align=center| 4:08
| Saitama, Japan
| 
|-
| Loss
| align=center| 12–5
| Michael Bisping
| Decision (unanimous)
| UFC 152
| 
| align=center| 3
| align=center| 5:00
| Toronto, Ontario, Canada
| {{small|

|-
| Win
| align=center| 12–4
| Alessio Sakara
| KO (punches)
| UFC on Fuel TV: Gustafsson vs. Silva
| 
| align=center| 1
| align=center| 2:26
| Stockholm, Sweden
| 
|-
| Loss
| align=center| 11–4
| Chael Sonnen
| Submission (arm-triangle choke)
| UFC 136
| 
| align=center| 2
| align=center| 3:51
| Houston, Texas, U.S.
| 
|-
| Win
| align=center| 11–3
| Jorge Santiago
| TKO (punches)
| UFC 130
| 
| align=center| 2
| align=center| 4:29
| Las Vegas, Nevada, U.S.
| 
|-
| Win
| align=center| 10–3
| Chris Leben
| TKO (knee and punches)
| UFC 125
| 
| align=center| 1
| align=center| 3:37
| Las Vegas, Nevada, U.S.
| 
|-
| Win
| align=center| 9–3
| Mike Massenzio
| Submission (triangle choke)
| UFC Live: Jones vs. Matyushenko
| 
| align=center| 3
| align=center| 3:10
| San Diego, California, U.S.
| 
|-
| Loss
| align=center| 8–3
| Phil Davis
| Decision (unanimous)
| UFC 109
| 
| align=center| 3
| align=center| 5:00
| Las Vegas, Nevada, U.S.
| 
|-
| Win
| align=center| 8–2
| Rodney Wallace
| Decision (unanimous)
| The Ultimate Fighter: Heavyweights Finale
| 
| align=center| 3
| align=center| 5:00
| Las Vegas, Nevada, U.S.
| 
|-
| Win
| align=center| 7–2
| Steve Cantwell
| Decision (unanimous)
| UFC Fight Night: Diaz vs. Guillard
| 
| align=center| 3
| align=center| 5:00
| Oklahoma City, Oklahoma, U.S.
| 
|-
| Loss
| align=center| 6–2
| Krzysztof Soszynski
| Submission (kimura)
| UFC 97
| 
| align=center| 1
| align=center| 3:53
| Montreal, Quebec, Canada
| {{small|
|-
| Loss
| align=center| 6–1
| Steve Cantwell
| TKO (punches)
| WEC 35: Condit vs. Miura
| 
| align=center| 2
| align=center| 4:01
| Las Vegas, Nevada, U.S.
| 
|-
| Win
| align=center| 6–0
| Doug Marshall
| TKO (punches)
| WEC 33: Marshall vs. Stann
| 
| align=center| 1
| align=center| 1:35
| Las Vegas, Nevada, U.S.
| 
|-
| Win
| align=center| 5–0
| Jeremiah Billington
| TKO (punches)
| WEC 30
| 
| align=center| 1
| align=center| 3:07
| Las Vegas, Nevada, U.S.
| 
|-
| Win
| align=center| 4–0
| Craig Zellner
| TKO (punches)
| WEC 28
| 
| align=center| 1
| align=center| 4:57
| Las Vegas, Nevada, U.S.
| 
|-
| Win
| align=center| 3–0
| Steve Cantwell
| TKO (punches)
| WEC 26: Condit vs. Alessio
| 
| align=center| 1
| align=center| 0:41
| Las Vegas, Nevada, U.S.
| 
|-
| Win
| align=center| 2–0
| Miguel Cosio
| TKO (punches)
| WEC 21: Tapout
| 
| align=center| 1
| align=center| 0:16
| Highland, California, U.S.
| 
|-
| Win
| align=center| 1–0
| Aaron Stark
| TKO (punches)
| SF 14: Resolution
| 
| align=center| 1
| align=center| 3:14
| Portland, Oregon, U.S.
|

References

External links

 Brian Stann
 

Official UFC Profile
Hire Heroes USA
Brian Stann Quotes

1980 births
Living people
American football middle linebackers
American male mixed martial artists
United States Marine Corps personnel of the Iraq War
American practitioners of Brazilian jiu-jitsu
Light heavyweight mixed martial artists
Mixed martial artists from Pennsylvania
Middleweight mixed martial artists
Mixed martial artists utilizing MCMAP
Mixed martial artists utilizing Gaidojutsu
Mixed martial artists utilizing Brazilian jiu-jitsu
Mixed martial arts broadcasters
Navy Midshipmen football players
Players of American football from Pennsylvania
Recipients of the Silver Star
Sportspeople from Scranton, Pennsylvania
United States Marine Corps officers
United States Naval Academy alumni
World Extreme Cagefighting champions
Ultimate Fighting Championship male fighters